John Young (1895–1952) was an English footballer who played as a defender and left winger for Southend United, West Ham United, Queens Park Rangers and Accrington Stanley.

West Ham signed him for £600 from Southend in 1919, and he played for the club 138 times, scoring 3 goals.

He was part of the West Ham team that won promotion to the First Division and also appeared in the White Horse Final, the first FA Cup final to be held at the brand new Wembley Stadium, during the 1922-23 season.

He joined Queens Park Rangers in 1926 and moved to Stanley in 1929.

References

1895 births
1952 deaths
People from Whitburn, Tyne and Wear
Footballers from Tyne and Wear
English footballers
Association football fullbacks
South Shields F.C. (1889) players
Southend United F.C. players
West Ham United F.C. players
Queens Park Rangers F.C. players
Accrington Stanley F.C. players
English Football League players
FA Cup Final players